The Women's 1500m races for class T12 visually impaired athletes at the 2004 Summer Paralympics were held in the Athens Olympic Stadium on 27 September. Events were held in three disability classes. The event consisted of a single race, and was won by Elena Pautova, representing .

Final round

27 Sept. 2004, 20:25

References

W
2004 in women's athletics